Rozi is a 1990 Pakistani television series written by Imran Saleem and was based on the Hollywood film Tootsie it was produced and directed by Sahira Kazmi.

Synopsis 
Haroon (Moin) is a struggling actor and fails to find work, so he disguises himself as a girl name Rozi then he tries to find work.

Cast 
 Moin Akhter as Haroon / Rozi
 Frieha Altaf as Shahana
 Fazila Kaiser as Nazia
 Arsh Muneer as Bua Begum
 Latif Kapadia as Nasir  
 Akbar Subhani as Rasheed
 Hameed Wayne as Nazia's Father
 Sultan Khan as Maqsood Khan
 Anjum Ahmed as Farzana
 Anwar Kamal as Interviewer
 Sami Aadil as Director
 Ahmed Khan as Advertising
 Abul Kalma as Autographer
 Aamir Akhtar as Haroon's Friend
 Sajid Rafi as Haroon's Friend
 Masood Zia as  Assistant Director
 Ahmed Memon as Director

Production 
The drama was produced by STN (Shalimar Television Network) and was telecasted on PTV.

Legacy 
According to Zahid Ahmed, Moin Akhtar's performance in the series inspired him for his role Sameer/Sameera a person suffering from dissociative identity disorder in Ishq Zahe Naseeb which helped him to understand his character.

References

External links
 

1990s Pakistani television series
Pakistan Television Corporation original programming
Pakistani drama television series
Urdu-language television shows